Dickinson may refer to:

People 
  Dickinson (name)

Place names

United States
 Dickinson, Minnesota
 Dickinson, Broome County, New York
 Dickinson, Franklin County, New York
 Dickinson, North Dakota
 Dickinson, Texas
 Dickinson township, Cumberland County, Pennsylvania
 Dickinson County, Iowa
 Dickinson County, Kansas
 Dickinson County, Michigan
 Jonathan Dickinson State Park, southeast Florida
 Port Dickinson, New York

Canada
 Dickinson's Landing, Ontario, ghost town

Education

United States
 Dickinson College, liberal arts college in Carlisle, Pennsylvania
 Dickinson High School (Dickinson, North Dakota)
 John Dickinson High School, Wilmington, Delaware
 Dickinson School of Law, Carlisle, Pennsylvania
 Dickinson State University, public university in Dickinson, North Dakota
 Fairleigh Dickinson University, university in New Jersey

Other uses 
 Becton Dickinson, American medical equipment manufacturer
 Dickinson (TV series), an American comedy TV series, broadcast 2019–2021
 Dickinson (crater), a crater in the northeastern Atalanta Region of Venus

See also
 Dickenson (disambiguation)
Justice Dickinson (disambiguation)